The Center for Genomic Gastronomy is an independent research group that examines the biotechnology and biodiversity of human food systems.  The Center was founded in 2010 in Portland, Oregon and currently has research nodes in Bergen; Santa Cruz, CA; Porto; Dublin and Chennai. They are sometimes described as an artist-led think tank. 

Along with groups such as Fallen Fruit, Futurefarmers, Tissue Culture & Art Project,  Environmental Health Clinic they have been described as being part of a green avant-garde.

Mission & Research
The mission of the group is to map food controversies, prototype alternative culinary futures and imagine a more just, biodiverse & beautiful food system. 

Their Research is split into five primary research streams:
 Cultures of Biotechnology
 Eating in the Anthropocene
 Databases of Taste
 Protein Futures
 Food Phreaking

Images

Publications and Press

The Center for Genomic Gastronomy's research has been featured and reviewed in The Lancet, Nature, and Chemical & Engineering News.

Their work has been featured in books and anthologies such as Bio Art: Altered Realities and Neo.Life: 25 Visions for The Future of Our Species.

References
Global Appetites: American Power and the Literature of Food. (2013), Allison Carruth, Cambridge University Press. 
Food Hackers: Political and Metaphysical Gastronomes in the Hackerspaces. (2015), Denisa Kera, Zack Denfeld, Cathrine Kramer, GASTRONOMICA: The Journal of Critical Food Studies. Vol. 15 No. 2, Summer 2015; (pp. 49-56).
Experimental Eating (2015). Black Dog Publishing. 
 Bioart Kitchen: Art, Feminism and Technoscience (2016), Lindsay Kelley, I.B. Tauris. 
 Literature and Food Studies (2017), Amy L. Tigner, Allison Carruth. Routledge. 
 Food Futures: Speculative Performance in the Anthropocene (2017), Shelby Brewster, The Journal of American Drama and Theatre, Volume 29, Number 2. 
 Edible Speculations: Designing for Human-Food Interaction (2018), Markéta Dolejšová. 
Food: Eating Tomorrow: Bigger Than The Plate. (2019), Catherine Flood and May Rosenthal, V&A.

Selected works

The Glowing Sushi Cooking Show

The Glowing Sushi Cooking Show (2010) was an online cook show that "uses everyday ingredients and some simple kitchen chemistry to explore cutting edge biotechnology." and "finds an unexpected use for the first genetically engineered animal you can buy."

According to scholar Lindsay Kelley "Fish do not usually cross the pet/meat divide, with pet species kept separate from species that are farmed or caught as food. Glowing Sushi confuses these boundaries, collapsing the laboratory, kitchen, and aquarium to illustrate the ways in which a Glo-Fish's tranimality crosses and complicates relations between jellies, zebrafish, and humans."

EDIBLE Exhibition

EDIBLE: The Taste of Things to Come (2012) was an exhibition curated by the Center for Genomic Gastronomy at Science Gallery, Trinity College Dublin.  

In addition to exhibits, the show included events like curated meals, talks from local and international foodies, and selected recipes. A major component of the exhibition were the feeding times, prepared by the in-gallery kitchen, where visitors got the chance to experience various ingredients and curious tasters such as the vegan ortolan created by the Center for Genomic Gastronomy.

Food Phreaking
FOOD PHREAKING (2013-present) is the journal of experiments, exploits and explorations of the human food system. Each issue contains stories about the space where food, technology & open culture meet. In the introduction of the book Literature and Food Studies the authors use Food Phreaking as a case study to argue for the importance of close readings of vernacular literary practices.

Influences 
The Center for Genomic Gastronomy has been influenced by the following artists: 
 Agnes Denes
 Carl Cheng
 Center for Land Use Interpretation
 Critical Art Ensemble
 Free Art and Technology Lab 
 Graffiti Research Lab 
 Hackteria 
 Institute for Applied Autonomy
 Mierle Laderman Ukeles
 Natalie Jeremijenko
 Peter Fend 
 S.W.A.M.P.
 Yashas Shetty

See also 
 Molecular Gastronomy
 Do-it-yourself biology

Notes

External links 
 

BioArtists
International_artist_groups_and_collectives
New media artists
Public Interest Research Groups
Research groups